Denge may refer to:
 Denge Marsh, an area in Kent, England
 RAF Denge, a former military site near Dungeness in Kent, England
 Denge Wood, a wood near Canterbury in Kent, England
 Ayanda Denge, South African trans woman and activist

See also 
 Deng (disambiguation)
 Dengie, a village in Essex
 Dengue fever